The Land Registry Act 1862 (25 & 26 Vict c 53) was an Act of the Parliament of the United Kingdom. It was a first attempt at a system of land registration.

This system proved ineffective and, following further attempts in 1875 and 1897, the present system was brought into force by the Land Registration Act 1925 as amended by the Land Registration Act 2002.

Notes
This article incorporates content from the following article: Land registration.

References
Charles Fortescue-Bricksdale. The Practice of the Land Registry Under the Transfer of Land Act, 1862. Waterlow and Sons Limited. London. 1891. Google Books.
The Land Registry Act 1862

External links
 

United Kingdom Acts of Parliament 1862
English property law
Acts of the Parliament of the United Kingdom concerning England and Wales
Land registration